The 2016 San Diego mayoral election was held on Tuesday, June 7, 2016, to elect the Mayor for San Diego. Incumbent Kevin Faulconer ran for a second term as Mayor against former San Diego City Council member Ed Harris and former California State Assembly member Lori Saldaña.

Municipal elections in California are officially non-partisan, though some candidates do receive funding and support from various political parties. The non-partisan primary was held Tuesday, June 7, 2016. Faulconer received a majority of votes in the general election, precluding the need for a November runoff.

Candidates

Qualified
Kevin Faulconer, incumbent Mayor of San Diego (voter registration: Republican)
Ed Harris, former San Diego City Council member (voter registration: Democrat)
Lori Saldaña, former California State Assembly member (voter registration: No party preference)

Campaign
In October 2015, Ocean Beach Town Council president Gretchen Newsom became the first major Democratic candidate to announce that she would challenge Kevin Faulconer's bid for re-election. However, Newsom dropped out of the race only seven weeks after declaring her candidacy.

In January 2016, former California State Assembly member Lori Saldaña announced that she intended to run for mayor against Faulconer. Although Saldaña had been a Democrat while in the state assembly, she subsequently left the party in September 2014 and intended to run for mayor as an independent.

In March 2016, former San Diego City Council member Ed Harris declared his intention to run for mayor.

General election
The general election was held on Tuesday, June 7, 2016.

Results

General election
Because Faulconer won a majority of the votes in the primary, there was no need for a runoff in the November general election.

References

2016 California elections
2016 United States mayoral elections
2016
2010s in San Diego
2016 in California